The bulk (305 from 330) of the qualification quota will be awarded based on European rankings as of December 31, 2014.

The maximum number of athletes per country is 2 in each event. In case there are more than 2 athletes among the top ranked, then the extra places are added to the pool of universality, which are awarded to ensure a larger number of nations enjoy representation. In addition, regardless of ranking, as hosts Azerbaijan is guaranteed 9 host quota places, 5 for men and 4 for women.

There will be no separate quota places in respect of the mixed events. Rather, only nations with entries in both the relevant men's and women's events will be able to compete with existing shooters.

Quota per event
Quota places are based on the European ranking as of December 31, 2014. These places are awarded to athletes who are among the:
30 top-ranked in trap and skeet (men);
28 top-ranked in all individual pistol and rifle events (men and women);
18 top-ranked in trap and skeet (women), and double trap (men).

Qualification summary

References

European Games
Qualification
Qualification for the 2015 European Games